I Came Upon a Lighthouse: A Short Memoir of Life with Ratan Tata is a memoir written by Shantanu Naidu and illustrated by Sanjana Desai. Published by HarperCollins India in January 2021, the memoir explores the life and relation between the millennial Naidu and the octogenarian industrialist, Ratan Tata. The book is an illustrated memoir of Naidu's candid interaction with Tata over five years.

References 

Indian literature in English
Debut books
2021 non-fiction books
Indian memoirs